Junodia congica is a species of mantis found in the Congo River region. It was first described in 1915 by Ermanno Giglio-Tos.

References

congica
Mantodea of Africa
Insects described in 1915